The giant cave gecko (Pseudothecadactylus lindneri) is a gecko endemic to Australia.

References

Pseudothecadactylus
Reptiles described in 1975
Taxa named by Harold Cogger
Geckos of Australia